The second Los Angeles federal building in Los Angeles County, California, more formally the United States Post Office and Courthouse, was a government building in the United States was designed by James Knox Taylor  and constructed between 1906 and 1910 on the block bounded by North Main, Spring, New High, and Temple Streets. The location was previously known as the Downey Block. 

The second federal building was made of “red sandstone on a white granite base” and cost $500,000. Upon completion, the six-story building housed a post office, Southern District of California courtrooms, customs offices, and revenue offices. The "impressive" post office was a marble-lined hall within the building. The circuit court moved into the building in September 1910. 

However, the population of Los Angeles grew rapidly in the early part of the 20th century, and a larger building was needed to serve the courts and federal agencies. The second federal building was razed in 1937 by the Works Progress Administration to clear the site for the Spring Street Courthouse.

The street address of this building may have been 201 N. Main Street.

See also
 List of Los Angeles federal buildings
 List of United States federal courthouses in California
 Tajo Building

References

Federal buildings in Los Angeles
Buildings and structures in Downtown Los Angeles
Civic Center, Los Angeles
Courthouses in California
Federal courthouses in the United States
Government buildings in Los Angeles
Demolished buildings and structures in Los Angeles
1910 establishments in California
1937 disestablishments in California
Government buildings completed in 1910
1910s architecture in the United States